Cryptophasa phaeochtha is a moth in the family Xyloryctidae. It was described by Edward Meyrick in 1925. It is found on New Guinea.

The wingspan is 40–50 mm. The forewings are whitish ochreous with a suffused fuscous band occupying the costal third, darker towards the costa. The hindwings are light ochreous yellowish.

References

Cryptophasa
Moths described in 1925